Eric Beecher is an Australian journalist, editor and media proprietor. He was editor of the Sydney Morning Herald for four years and for three years was editor-in-chief of the Herald and Weekly Times group.

Career 
In 1990, he founded Text Publishing, which he sold to Fairfax Media in 2003 for $66 million. He purchased Crikey in 2005 for $1 million from its founder Stephen Mayne, a former Liberal staffer, now  a local council politician. He is a shareholder in Australian Independent Business Media, publisher of the online magazines Business Spectator and Eureka Report. In 2007, he received a Walkley Award for journalistic leadership.

References

Living people
Australian media executives
Year of birth missing (living people)
The Sydney Morning Herald editors